Laps Around The Sun is the third studio album by American country music artist Chris Lane.  It was released on July 13, 2018, the album is published via Big Loud Records.

Content
The lead single to the album is "Take Back Home Girl", a duet with Tori Kelly which has charted within top 15 of Hot Country Songs and Country Airplay. This song, along with "All the Right Problems" and "Old Flame", previously appeared on an EP titled Take Back Home which was released digitally in late 2017. Of the album's content, Lane said, "My goal was to make sure anyone who hears this album finds a song they can relate to. I hope I accomplished that." Like his previous album, it is produced by Joey Moi, co-owner of the Big Loud label.

Track listing

Charts

Weekly charts

Year-end charts

Certifications

References 

Chris Lane albums
2018 albums
Big Loud albums
Albums produced by Joey Moi